Osteolaemus is a genus of crocodiles. They are small, secretive crocodiles that occur in wetlands of West and Middle Africa. They are commonly known as the African dwarf crocodiles. Unlike other crocodiles, Osteolaemus are strictly nocturnal.

Species
The following species are recognized as being valid.

Nota bene: A binomial authority in parentheses indicates that the species was originally described in a genus other than Osteolaemus.

Molecular data suggest that Osteolaemus tetraspis consists of two lineages that would warrant recognition as distinct species.

References

Crocodylidae
Reptile genera
Crocodilians of Africa
Taxa named by Edward Drinker Cope